is a city located in Okinawa Prefecture, Japan.  The neighboring municipalities are Naha to the south, Ginowan to the north, and Nishihara to the east. As of November 2012, the city has an estimated population of 113,718 and a population density of 5,956.9 persons per km2. The total area is 19.09 km2.

United States Marine Corps base Camp Kinser is located on the city's coast.

Etymology
The name "Urasoe" is made up of two kanji characters. The first, means "a coastal area", and the second, means "ruling" or "uniting". The name is a reference to "ruling over many areas".

Geography
Urasoe sits to the south of Okinawa Island. Urasoe is rugged and hilly to the east, and the city slopes gently to the East China Sea in the west. Urasoe, while formerly agricultural, has become heavily urbanized due to its proximity to the prefectural capital of Naha.

Neighboring municipalities
Naha
Ginowan
Nishihara

Transportation
The city is served by Naha Airport and the Okinawa Expressway. Also it has three stations of Okinawa Urban Monorail (Yui Rail): Kyozuka, Urasoe-Maeda and Tedako-Uranishi.

History
Urasoe was the original capital of the Okinawan kingdom of Chūzan for several centuries until it was supplanted by Shuri in the late 14th or early 15th century. Shunten (1166 – 1237), the first known king of the Chuzan Kingdom, located in the central region of the island of Okinawa, ruled from Urasoe, as did his son and grandson. For much of the 14th century, Urasoe Castle was the largest on the island of Okinawa. The castle now contains the remains of several kings of the Ryukyu Kingdom.

Urasoe was completely razed during the Battle of Okinawa in 1945 at the end of World War II. 45% of the population, 4,117 residents, died during the battle. The village office of Urasoe was re-established in 1946 to conduct basic administrative functions, settle refugees returning to the village, and restore agricultural land. The village saw a significant increase in U.S. military presence in 1950 in the western coast of the village, which eventually became Camp Kinser. The population of Urasoe rapidly from 1956, and the city became a bedroom community of Naha in this period. Urasoe was elevated to city status on July 1, 1970.

Economy
The beer company Orion Breweries has its headquarters in Urasoe.

Notable residents
Urasoe is the hometown of Japanese actress, musician and former idol Yukie Nakama.

References

External links

 Urasoe City official website 
 

Cities in Okinawa Prefecture
Capitals of former nations